Bieda is a surname and toponym. It may refer to:

 Blera, town in Italy formerly named Bieda
 Jarosława Bieda (born 1937), Polish athlete
 Steve Bieda (born 1961), American politician

See also
 

Polish-language surnames